The House of Blois is a lineage derived from the Frankish nobility, whose principal members were often named Theobald (Thibaud, Thibault, Thibaut in French).

History
Heirs of the viscounts of Blois, the House of Blois accumulated the counties of Blois, Chartres, Châteaudun, Troyes, Meaux — as successors of Herbertians — etc., then the county of Champagne, and finally the kingdom of Navarre. The family was founded by Theobald the Old in the year 906.

When Louis VII of France was greatly threatened by the vast collection of territories in the person of Henry II of England, he chose a wife from the House of Champagne (Adela of Champagne) as a counterpoise to Angevin power.

The senior line of the House of Blois became extinct with the death of Joan I of Navarre, wife of Philip IV of France, in 1305. Champagne and Navarre passed to the Capetian dynasty.

King Stephen I of England, 1135–1154, was both a member of the House of Blois and the last Anglo-Norman King, being the grandson of William the Conqueror through his daughter Adela of Normandy.

A branch of the family was established in Sancerre by Stephen I of Sancerre, a younger son of Theobald II, Count of Champagne. This branch became extinct at the death of Margaret of Sancerre in 1418 or 1419.

Rulers

Genealogy

 Theobald the Old, Viscount of Blois
 Theobald I, Count of Blois
 Hugh, Archbishop of Bourges
  Odo I, Count of Blois
 Theobald II of Blois
  Odo II, Count of Blois
 Theobald III, Count of Blois
 Stephen, Count of Blois
 William, Count of Sully
  Henry de Sully, Abbot of Fécamp
 Theobald II, Count of Champagne
 Henry I, Count of Champagne
 Henry II, Count of Champagne
  Theobald III, Count of Champagne
  Theobald I of Navarre
 Theobald II of Navarre
  Henry I of Navarre
  Joan I of Navarre
 Theobald V, Count of Blois
  Louis I, Count of Blois
  Theobald VI, Count of Blois
  Margaret, Countess of Blois
 William White Hands
  Stephen I of Sancerre
 William I, Count of Sancerre
  Louis I, Count of Sancerre
 John I, Count of Sancerre
 Stephen II, Count of Sancerre
 John II, Count of Sancerre
  Louis II, Count of Sancerre
 John III, Count of Sancerre
  Margaret, Countess of Sancerre
 Louis de Sancerre, Constable of France
 Robert, Lord of Menetou
 Theobald, Lord of Sagonne
  Stephen, Lord of Vailly-sur-Sauldre
 Theobald, Bishop of Tournai
  Louis, Lord of Sagonne
  Robert, Lord of Menetou-Salon
  Stephen II, Lord of Châtillon-sur-Loing, Grand Butler of France
  Stephen III, Lord of Châtillon-sur-Loing
 Stephen, King of England
 Eustace IV, Count of Boulogne
  William I, Count of Boulogne
  Henry of Blois, Bishop of Winchester
 Philip, Bishop of Châlons-sur-Marne
 Odo V, Count of Troyes
  Hugh, Count of Champagne
  Eudes I of Champlitte (disowned by father)
 Odo II of Champlitte
  William of Champlitte, 1st prince of Achaea
  Stephen II, Count of Troyes and Meaux
  Odo, Count of Champagne
  Stephen, Count of Aumale
  William le Gros, 1st Earl of Albemarle
  Richard, Archbishop of Bourges

Arms

See also 

Navarre monarchs family tree
List of Navarrese monarchs from the House of Blois

References

|-

|-

 
 
 
Blois
Champagne
Navarre
Navarrese monarchs
Navarrese royal houses